No. 10 "Fighter" Squadron is a squadron of the Sri Lanka Air Force. It currently operates the IAI Kfir from SLAF Katunayake. The squadron is tasked with providing offensive support for ground & maritime (anti-shipping) operations, air interdiction and interception. It specializes in high altitude precision ground attacks.

History
The squadron was formed on January 5, 1996 at the SLAF Katunayake with six IAI Kfir multi-role fighter jets acquired from Israel, with US State Department approval. These included five C2 types and a TC.2 type trainer. At its formation the squadron had six pilots, four engineers and 70 technicians along with the six aircraft. In 2000, the squadron received eight more Kfirs that included C7 types and another trainer. 

On November 2, 2007 the Sri Lankan Air Force claimed that aircraft from the squadron killed the LTTE’s Political Wing Leader S.P. Thamilselvan and a group of LTTE cadres in an air raid. During the last phase of the war it maintained units at SLAF China Bay.

In March 2009, the squadron was presented with the President’s Colours.

By 2017 only one Kfir was serviceable out of 7 while Mig 23 and Mig 27 of the No. 12 Squadron grounded in the same year.

In 2021 government approved a US$49 million deal with Israel Aerospace Industries to update the remaining five Kfirs to Block 60 standard.

Aircraft operated

Year of introduction
 IAI Kfir C2 - 1996
 IAI Kfir TC2 - 1996
 IAI Kfir C7 - 2000

Notable members
 Monath Perera

References

External links
Sri Lanka Air Force  Base Katunayake 
scramble.nl
Kfir, the dare-devil air monster 
Men who killed Thamilselvam speak

Military units and formations established in 1996
10